Henry Loasby (13 October 1911 – 1990) was an English professional footballer. He made 77 Football League appearances for Northampton Town, Luton Town and Gillingham. He later had a spell as manager of his hometown club, Kettering Town.

References

1911 births
1990 deaths
English footballers
English football managers
Gillingham F.C. players
Northampton Town F.C. players
Luton Town F.C. players
Kettering Town F.C. managers
Sportspeople from Kettering
Kettering Town F.C. players
Association football forwards